This is a list of county seats in the U.S. State of Colorado and its predecessors: the Territory of Colorado and the extralegal Territory of Jefferson.


Territory of Jefferson
The Provisional Government of the Territory of Jefferson established 12 counties on November 28, 1859, which served as de facto local government until the extralegal territory yielded to the new Territory of Colorado on June 6, 1861.

The 12 counties of Jefferson Territory and their county seats:
Arrappahoe County
Denver City
Cheyenne County
No county seat designated.
El Paso County
Colorado City
Fountain County
Pueblo
Heele County
La Porte
Jackson County
Boulder City
Jefferson County
Arapahoe City – November 28, 1859 to November 6, 1860
Golden City – November 6, 1860 to June 6, 1861
Mountain County
Central City
North County
No county seat designated.
Park County
Tarryall City
St. Vrain's County
St. Vrain
Saratoga County
Breckinridge

Territory and State of Colorado
On February 28, 1861, U.S. President James Buchanan signed An Act to provide a temporary Government for the Territory of Colorado. The Territory of Colorado created 29 counties of which 26 still exist.

On August 1, 1876, U.S. President Ulysses S. Grant issued Proclamation 230: Admission of Colorado into the Union. The State of Colorado has created 41 counties of which 38 still exist, for a total of 64 existing counties.

The 64 current and six extinct counties of Colorado and their county seats

Adams County  (November 15, 1902 to present)
Brighton
Alamosa County  (March 8, 1913 to present)
Alamosa
Arapahoe County  (November 1, 1861 to November 15, 1902, and April 11, 1903, to present)
Denver City/Denver – November 1, 1861 to November 15, 1902
Littleton – April 11, 1903 to present
Archuleta County  (April 14, 1885 to present)
Pagosa Springs
Baca County  (April 16, 1889 to present)
Springfield
Bent County  (February 11, 1870 to present)
Las Animas – February 11, 1870 to 1870
Boggsville – 1870 to 1872
Las Animas – 1872 to 1875
West Las Animas/Las Animas – 1875 to present
Boulder County  (November 1, 1861 to present)
Boulder City/Boulder
City and County of Broomfield  (November 15, 2001 to present)
Broomfield
Carbonate County  (February 8, 1879 to February 10, 1879)
Granite
Chaffee County  (February 10, 1879 to present)
Granite – February 10, 1879 to 1888
Buena Vista – 1888 to 1928
Salida – 1928 to present
Cheyenne County  (March 25, 1889 to present)
Cheyenne Wells
Clear Creek County  (November 1, 1861 to present)
Idaho - November 1, 1861 to 1867
Georgetown – 1867 to present
Conejos County  (November 7, 1861 to present)
Guadaloupe - November 7, 1861 to 1863
Conejos - 1863 to present
Costilla County  (November 1, 1861 to present)
San Miguel – November 1, 1861 to 1863
San Luis – 1863 to present
Crowley County  (May 29, 1911 to present)
Ordway
Custer County  (March 9, 1877 to present)
Ula – March 9, 1877 to 1878
Rosita – 1878 to 1886
Silver Cliff – 1886 to 1928
Westcliffe – 1928 to present
Delta County  (February 11, 1883 to present)
Delta
City and County of Denver  (December 1, 1902 to present)
Denver
Dolores County  (March 4, 1881 to present)
Rico – March 4, 1881 to 1945
Dove Creek – 1945 to present
Douglas County  (November 1, 1861 to present)
Frankstown – November 1, 1861 to 1864
California Ranch – 1864 to 1874
Castle Rock – 1874 to present
Eagle County  (February 11, 1883 to present)
Red Cliff – February 11, 1883 to 1921
Eagle – 1921 to present
El Paso County  (November 1, 1861 to present)
Colorado City – November 1, 1861 to 1873
Colorado Springs – 1873 to present
Elbert County  (February 2, 1874 to present)
Kiowa
Fremont County  (November 1, 1861 to present)
Cañon City
Garfield County  (February 10, 1883 to present)
Carbonate – February 10, 1883 to 1883
Glenwood Springs – 1883 to present
Gilpin County  (November 1, 1861 to present)
Central City
Grand County  (February 2, 1874 to present)
Hot Sulphur Springs – February 2, 1874 to 1882
Grand Lake – 1882 to 1888
Hot Sulphur Springs/Sulphur Springs/Hot Sulphur Springs – 1888 to present
Greenwood County  (February 11, 1870 to February 6, 1874
Kit Carson
Guadaloupe County  (November 1, 1861 to November 7, 1861
Guadaloupe
Gunnison County  (March 9, 1877 to present)
Gunnison
Hinsdale County  (February 10, 1874 to present)
San Juan City – February 10, 1874 to 1875
Lake City – 1875 to present
Huerfano County  (November 1, 1861 to present)
Autobees Plaza – November 1, 1861 to 1868
Badito – 1868 to 1874
Walsenburgh/Resort/Walsenburgh/Walsenburg – 1874 to present
Jackson County  (May 5, 1909 to present)
Walden
Jefferson County  (November 1, 1861 to present)
Golden City/Golden
Kiowa County  (April 11, 1889 to present)
Sheridan Lake – April 11, 1889 to 1902
Eads – 1902 to present
Kit Carson County  (April 11, 1889 to present)
Burlington
La Plata County  (February 10, 1874 to present)
Howardsville – February 10, 1874 to 1876
Parrott City – 1876 to 1881
Durango – 1881 to present
Lake County  (November 1, 1861 to February 8, 1879, and February 10, 1879, to present)
Oro City – November 1, 1861 to 1863
Lourette – 1863 to 1866
Dayton – 1866 to 1868
Granite – 1868 to February 8, 1879
Leadville – February 10, 1879 to present
Larimer County  (November 1, 1861 to present)
La Porte – November 1, 1861 to 1868
Fort Collins – 1868 to present
Las Animas County  (February 9, 1866 to present)
Trinidad
Lincoln County  (April 11, 1889 to present)
Hugo
Logan County - February 25, 1887 to present)
Sterling
Mesa County  (February 14, 1883 to present)
Grand Junction
Mineral County - March 27, 1893 to present)
Wason – March 27, 1893 to 1893
Creede – 1893 to present
Moffat County  (February 27, 1911 to present)
Craig
Montezuma County  (April 16, 1889 to present)
Cortez
Montrose County  (February 11, 1883 to present)
Montrose
Morgan County  (February 19, 1889 to present)
Fort Morgan
Otero County  (March 25, 1889 to present)
La Junta
Ouray County  (January 18, 1877 to February 27, 1883, and March 2, 1883, to present)
Ouray
Park County  (November 1, 1861 to present)
Tarryall – November 1, 1861 to 1866
Buckskin – 1866 to 1868
Fair Play/Fairplay – 1868 to present
Phillips County  (March 27, 1889 to present)
Holyoke
Pitkin County  (February 23, 1881 to present)
Aspen
Platte County  (February 9, 1872 to February 9, 1874
Platte County failed to organize.
Prowers County  (April 11, 1889 to present)
Lamar
Pueblo County  (November 1, 1861 to present)
Pueblo
Rio Blanco County  (March 25, 1889 to present)
Meeker
Rio Grande County  (February 10, 1874 to present)
Del Norte – February 10, 1874 to ?
Routt County  (January 29, 1877 to present)
Hayden – January 29, 1877 to 1878
Hahns Peak – 1878 to 1912
Steamboat Springs – 1912 to present
Saguache County  (December 29, 1866 to present)
Saguache, Colorado
San Juan County  (January 31, 1876 to present)
Silverton
San Miguel County  (March 2, 1883 to present)
Telluride
Sedgwick County  (April 9, 1889 to present)
Julesburg
South Arapahoe County (November 15, 1902 to April 11, 1903)
Littleton
Summit County  (November 1, 1861 to present)
Parkville – November 1, 1861 to 1862
Breckenridge – 1862 to present
Teller County  (March 23, 1899 to present)
Cripple Creek
Uncompahgre County - February 27, 1883 to March 2, 1883
Ouray
Washington County  (February 9, 1887 to present)
Akron
Weld County  (November 1, 1861 to present)
Saint Vrain – November 1, 1861 to 1868
Latham – 1868 to 1870
Evans – 1870 to 1874
Greeley – 1874 to 1875
Evans – 1875 to 1877
Greeley – 1877 to present
Yuma County  (March 15, 1889 to present)
Yuma – March 15, 1889 to 1902
Wray – 1902 to present

County seat distinctions
Of the 64 current counties of Colorado, 39 have retained their original county seat.
Weld County has changed its county seat five times; in 1868, 1870, 1874, 1875, and 1877.
Lake County has had five different county seats: Oro City, Lourette, Dayton, Granite, and Leadville.
Granite has served as the county seat of three counties: Lake County, Carbonate County, and Chaffee County.

See also

Colorado
Bibliography of Colorado
Index of Colorado-related articles
Outline of Colorado
Colorado statistical areas
Geography of Colorado
History of Colorado
List of counties in Colorado
List of places in Colorado
List of mountain passes in Colorado
List of mountain peaks of Colorado
List of mountain ranges of Colorado
List of populated places in Colorado
List of census-designated places in Colorado
List of county seats in Colorado
List of forts in Colorado
List of ghost towns in Colorado
List of historic places in Colorado
List of municipalities in Colorado
List of populated places in Colorado by county
List of post offices in Colorado
List of rivers of Colorado
List of protected areas of Colorado

Notes

References

External links

Colorado state government website
Colorado tourism website
History Colorado website

 
Colorado geography-related lists
Colorado history-related lists
Lists of populated places in Colorado